Bitter-Sweet is the sixteenth studio album by English singer Bryan Ferry, officially under the name of Bryan Ferry and His Orchestra. It was released on 30 November 2018 by BMG Rights Management.

Background
The album, containing remakes of older songs by Ferry and Roxy Music in the same style as his 2012 album The Jazz Age, came up after Ferry's participation on the German TV series Babylon Berlin.

As shown in the album credits, Ferry dedicated Bitter-Sweet to his friend Jeremy Catto, who had died that year.

Track listing
All tracks composed by Bryan Ferry, except where noted.

 "Alphaville" (Ferry, David A. Stewart)
 "Reason or Rhyme"
 "Sign of the Times"
 "New Town"
 "Limbo" (Ferry, Patrick Leonard)
 "Bitter-Sweet" (Ferry, Andy Mackay)
 "Dance Away"
 "Zamba" (Ferry, Patrick Leonard)
 "Sea Breezes"
 "While My Heart Is Still Beating" (Ferry, Andy Mackay)
 "Bitters End"
 "Chance Meeting"
 "Boys and Girls"

Charts

References

2018 albums
Albums produced by Rhett Davies
BMG Rights Management albums
Bryan Ferry albums